Daniel Half Human and the Good Nazi is a 2000 young adult literature novel by German author David Chotjewitz, translated into English by Doris Orgel.  The first US edition was published in 2004 by Atheneum Books for Young Readers. The novel is set in Hamburg, Germany in flashback and forward between 1945 at the end of World War II and in the 1930s, during the rise of the Nazi party. It deals with the effects of antisemitism on two friends. It has been cited in 16 award lists, including as a Mildred L. Batchelder Honor Book.

References

Sources
 

2004 German novels
German children's novels
Children's historical novels
Novels about Nazi Germany
Novels about racism
Novels set in Germany
Novels set in the 1930s
Atheneum Books books